Castellino Castello (1580–1649) was an Italian painter of the Baroque period, active mainly in Genoa. He trained with Giovanni Battista Paggi.

References

1580 births
1649 deaths
16th-century Italian painters
Italian male painters
17th-century Italian painters
Italian Baroque painters
Painters from Genoa